Michael McGee, or Mike McGee is a name and may refer to:

Sports
Michael McGee (Gaelic footballer)
 Mike McGee (American football) (1938–2019), American football player and coach, college athletics administrator
 Mike McGee (basketball) (born 1959), American basketball coach and former NBA player

Others
 Michael McGee Jr. (born 1969), former Milwaukee alderman
 Michael Calvin McGee (1943–2002), American rhetorical theorist, writer and social critic
 Mike McGee (gallery director), gallery director for the CSUF Begovich Gallery in Fullerton, California, United States
 Mighty Mike McGee (born 1976), American slam poet

See also 
 Michael Magee (disambiguation)